PSGL stands for Persatuan Sepakbola Gayo Lues (en: Football Association of Gayo Lues). PSGL Gayo Lues is an  Indonesian football club based in Gayo Lues Regency, Aceh. They played in the 2011-12 Premier Division, the second tier league in Indonesia. However, now they play in the lowest tier Indonesian league, Liga 3.

References

External links
 

Football clubs in Indonesia
Football clubs in Aceh
Association football clubs established in 2007
2007 establishments in Indonesia